Bulgarian Beach (Balgarsko Kraybrezhie \'b&l-gar-sko krI-'bre-zhi-e\) is a coast in the north part of Hurd Peninsula, eastern Livingston Island, extending 2.3 km from Hespérides Point to the southwest to Perunika Glacier to the northeast, and forming the southeast coast of Emona Anchorage.

The beach comprises four predominantly cobble beaches, separated by a shore rock known locally as Greenpeace Rock, which rises to 6m and is located 800 m northeast of Hespérides Point, by Spanish Point and by a minor nameless point lying 400 m to east by northeast of the latter. The last beach is a narrow strip under the cliff of a part of Perunika Glacier terminating on the coast.  Bulgarian Beach is surmounted by a chain of five hills comprising Hesperides Hill, Pesyakov Hill, Sinemorets Hill, Spanish Knoll and Belozem Hill.  In summer the area is predominantly snow-free and crossed by four meltwater streams draining the north-western slope of the Balkan Snowfield, with stream mouths located at the western extremities of each beach.  The first beach, locally known as Base Beach, is partly occupied by Grand Lagoon formed by Rezovski Creek.  Access by dinghies to Base Beach, used for transfer of people and cargo to the Bulgarian base St. Kliment Ohridski, is sometimes rendered difficult by shallow waters.

The area would have been known and possibly visited in the early nineteenth century by English and American sealers frequenting South Bay and particularly the nearby Johnsons Dock.

Location
Bulgarian Beach was mapped in detail by the Spanish Servicio Geográfico del Ejército in 1991 following earlier British, Argentine and Chilean mappings. Bulgarian mapping of Bulgarian Beach and the Emona Anchorage coast from a topographic survey carried out from 8 December 1995 to 8 February 1996, and mapping of the St. Kliment Ohridski Base vicinity at a larger scale from a topographic survey made from January 31 to February 4, 1996.

Maps
 Isla Livingston: Península Hurd. Mapa topográfico de escala 1:25000. Madrid: Servicio Geográfico del Ejército, 1991. (Map reproduced on p. 16 of the linked work)
 L.L. Ivanov. Livingston Island: Central-Eastern Region. Scale 1:25000 topographic map.  Sofia: Antarctic Place-names Commission of Bulgaria, 1996.
 L.L. Ivanov et al. Antarctica: Livingston Island and Greenwich Island, South Shetland Islands. Scale 1:100000 topographic map. Sofia: Antarctic Place-names Commission of Bulgaria, 2005.
 L.L. Ivanov. Antarctica: Livingston Island and Greenwich, Robert, Snow and Smith Islands. Scale 1:120000 topographic map.  Troyan: Manfred Wörner Foundation, 2009.  
 Antarctic Digital Database (ADD). Scale 1:250000 topographic map of Antarctica. Scientific Committee on Antarctic Research (SCAR). Since 1993, regularly upgraded and updated.
 Antarctica, South Shetland Islands, Livingston Island: Bulgarian Antarctic Base. Sheets 1 and 2. Scale 1:2000 topographic map. Geodesy, Cartography and Cadastre Agency, 2016. (in Bulgarian)
 L.L. Ivanov. Antarctica: Livingston Island and Smith Island. Scale 1:100000 topographic map. Manfred Wörner Foundation, 2017.

Notes

References
 Bulgarian Beach. SCAR Composite Gazetteer of Antarctica
 Bulgarian Antarctic Gazetteer. Antarctic Place-names Commission. (details in Bulgarian, basic data in English)

External links
 Bulgarian Beach. Copernix satellite image

Beaches of Livingston Island
Bulgaria and the Antarctic